A supercell is a thunderstorm with a deep, persistently rotating updraft.

Supercell may also refer to:

Supercell (crystal), a repeating unit cell of a crystal that contains several primitive cells
Supercell (mobile network), a mobile phone network in North Kivu, Democratic Republic of Congo
Supercell (video game company), a Finnish video game company
Supercell (band), a Japanese 11-member music group
Supercell (album), the band's debut album
Supercell (film), an upcoming American disaster film